Namanlu (also Romanized as Nāmānlū) is a village in Jirestan Rural District, Sarhad District, Shirvan County, North Khorasan Province, Iran. At the 2006 census, its population was 638, in 150 families.

References 

Populated places in Shirvan County